Eucalyptus laeliae, commonly known as the Darling Range ghost gum or butter gum, is a species of small to medium-sized tree occurring only on the western side of the Darling Range. It has smooth white, powdery bark, lance-shaped adult leaves, flower buds in groups of between seven and eleven, creamy white flowers and cup-shaped to barrel-shaped fruit.

Description
The bark is smooth, powdery, usually white but in autumn, butter yellow.

Flowering occurs between December and February and the flowers are creamy white or white, soft and bristly.

Taxonomy and naming
Eucalyptus laeliae was first formally described by the botanists Francis Podger and George Chippendale in 1969 in the Journal of the Royal Society of Western Australia. The type specimen was collected by Leslie McGann near North Dandalup in 1966. The species name laeliae is taken from the names of one of the vestal virgins, referring to the smooth, column-like trunk.

Distribution and habitat
The Darling Range ghost gum is found on hills and amongst granite outcrops along the west coast in the Peel and South West regions of Western Australia between Kalamunda in the north, Wandering to the east and Capel to the south where it grows in sandy-clay-loam soils.

Use in horticulture
The tree can be bought commercially as a seedling or as seeds. It grows well in full sun in a range of well-drained soil types. It can be susceptible to leaf blister, a form of insect attack.

Conservation status
This eucalypt is classified as "not threatened" in Western Australia by the Western Australian Government Department of Parks and Wildlife.

See also

List of Eucalyptus species

References

laeliae
Myrtales of Australia
Trees of Australia
Eucalypts of Western Australia
Trees of Mediterranean climate
Plants described in 1969
Endemic flora of Southwest Australia